Cafe Express operates 2 fast-casual, bistro-style restaurants in the U.S. state of Texas in Houston, TX. The company's headquarters are in Houston.

The chain was founded in 1984 by Schiller Del Grande Restaurant Group. In 2004 fast food giant Wendy's International acquired a 70% stake in Cafe Express. In 2007, Wendy's sold the company back to Schiller Del Grande and its original investor, Redstone.

References

External links
 Cafe Express

Regional restaurant chains in the United States
Restaurants in Texas
Wendy's International
Companies based in Houston
Restaurants established in 1984
1984 establishments in Texas